Events in the year 2023 in Mauritania.

Incumbents 
President: Mohamed Ould Ghazouani
Prime Minister: Mohamed Ould Bilal

Events 

 13 May – First round of the 2023 Mauritanian parliamentary election.
 27 May – Second round of the 2023 Mauritanian parliamentary election.

References 

 
2020s in Mauritania
Years of the 21st century in Mauritania
Mauritania
Mauritania